Consuelo Mayendía was a Spanish soprano and actress, born in Valencia.

Biography 
Most of Mayendía's career occurred during the first quarter of the 20th century where she became one of the biggest stars in the Teatro Apolo of Madrid. She performed in operettas and lyrical sketches which she combined in many instances with libretto by  Carlos Arnichesmy, sharing the stage with José Moncayo. They appeared together in El trust de los tenorios (1910), El amo de la calle (1910), El amigo Melquíades (1914), Serafín el pinturero (1916). She also premiered in Diana la cazadora (1915), written by Hermanos Álvarez Quintero, with music by María Rodrigo. She was married to actor Cristóbal Sánchez del Pino.

References

Spanish stage actresses
19th-century births
20th-century deaths

Spanish sopranos
People from Valencia
20th-century Spanish actresses